William Collumpton was Archdeacon of Totnes in England during 1549.

References

Archdeacons of Totnes